Ariel Fenster (born April 18, 1943) is a Canadian science educator, chemist, and founding member of McGill University's Office for Science and Society. Fenster lectures extensively in both French and English on topics of health, the environment, and technology. He was a frequent television and radio presenter on science-related subjects.

Now retired from teaching, he remains active in science education. Throughout his career, he has given more than 800 public lectures, in English and in French, making science accessible through topics such as the chemistry of wine, cooking and art forgery.

Fenster teaches that science is relevant to people's everyday life: "By teaching the chemistry of everyday life, I feel we play an important role in people’s lives. We’re more scared now we’ve ever been because we’re bombarded with information – too much information. Through our courses, we try to provide people with useful information. Balanced information. We want people to understand that everything they do involves risk. We risk death by driving to work in the morning, but we take that risk because we know exactly how dangerous it is. With food, drugs and the environment, people don’t have that same information."

From the University of Paris, Fenster completed a Bachelor of Science in mathematics, physics, and chemistry in 1966 and a Master of Science in theoretical and physical chemistry in 1967. In 1973, he obtained his Doctor of Philosophy in physical and inorganic chemistry from McGill University. In addition to starting his teaching career at McGill University in 1982, he taught at both Dawson College from 1974 to 1984 and Vanier College from 1985 to 2003, two CEGEP-level institutions in Montreal, Quebec.

Selected awards

References 

1943 births
Living people
20th-century Canadian chemists
Academic staff of McGill University
Academic staff of Dawson College
People from Bergerac, Dordogne
University of Paris alumni
McGill University Faculty of Science alumni
French emigrants to Canada
21st-century Canadian chemists